Welzbach may refer to:

Welzbach (Rhine), a river of Rhineland-Palatinate, Germany, tributary of the Rhine
Welzbach (Main), a river of Bavaria and of Hesse, Germany, tributary of the Main
Welzbach (Tauber), a river of Baden-Württemberg and of Bavaria, Germany, tributary of the Tauber